The 2005 National League Division Series (NLDS), the opening round of the 2005 National League playoffs, began on Tuesday, October 4, and ended on Sunday, October 9, with the champions of the three NL divisions—along with a "wild card" team—participating in two best-of-five series. They were:

(1) St. Louis Cardinals (Central Division champions, 100–62) vs. (3) San Diego Padres (Western Division champions, 82–80): Cardinals win series, 3–0.
(2) Atlanta Braves (Eastern Division champions, 90–72) vs. (4) Houston Astros (Wild Card, 89–73): Astros win series, 3–1.

The Cardinals and Astros went on to meet in the NL Championship Series (NLCS). The Astros became the National League champion, and lost to the American League champion Chicago White Sox in the 2005 World Series.

Matchups

St. Louis Cardinals vs. San Diego Padres

Atlanta Braves vs. Houston Astros

St. Louis vs. San Diego

Game 1
Busch Stadium (II) in St. Louis, Missouri

It was a matchup between Jake Peavy and eventual 2005 Cy Young Award winner Chris Carpenter. In the bottom of the first, Jim Edmonds's one-out solo home run put the Cardinals up 1–0. Then in the bottom of the third, Peavy's control slipped away as a bases-loaded wild pitch and a two-run single by Reggie Sanders gave the Cards a 4–0 lead. However, Sanders would provide more offense with a grand slam in the fifth. That would make the score 8–0 and give Sanders six RBIs in the game. The Padres would not go quietly, though. They would scratch out a run in the seventh on a sacrifice fly by Khalil Greene off Brad Thompson after a leadoff double and single, then one more on a home run by Eric Young in the eighth off Randy Flores. After the Padres put runners on the corners in the ninth off Cal Eldred, Jason Isringhausen came on to close the deal. Yet, after Young's groundout scored a run, four consecutive hits with two outs, two of which by Mark Loretta and Brian Giles, made the score 8–5 and loaded the bases with the go-ahead run at the plate. Ramón Hernández did not deliver as he struck out to end the game.

Game 2
Busch Stadium (II) in St. Louis, Missouri

Pedro Astacio faced Mark Mulder in Game 2. The game remained scoreless until the bottom of the third when a walk to Abraham Nunez and an error by Khalil Greene on Yadier Molina's ground ball put two on with no out. After a sacrifice bunt, David Eckstein's fielder's choice scored a run, then a walk loaded the bases before Albert Pujols walked to score another. After a leadoff single and double, a fielder's choice by Molina and squeeze play by Eckstein made it 4–0 Cardinals in the fourth. In the top of the seventh, after being shutout for six innings, a double and two singles, the second of which by Xavier Nady scoring a run, made it 4–1 and put the tying run at the plate. However, a double play killed the rally and the Padres would only get one. Reggie Sanders got two more RBIs with a two-run double in the bottom half of the inning off Rudy Seanez. A bases-loaded hit-by-pitch to Nady by Julián Tavárez made it 6–2 in the eighth, but Randy Flores struck out Mark Sweeney to end the threat while Jason Isringhausen retired the Padres in order in the ninth to give the Cardinals a 2–0 series lead.

Game 3
PETCO Park in San Diego, California

This was the first postseason game in PETCO Park history, which had opened the previous year. Matt Morris faced former Cardinals pitcher Woody Williams. Albert Pujols drove in David Eckstein with an RBI double in the top of the first after Eckstein singled to lead off. Then Eckstein hit a two-run home run in the second to make it 3–0. The Cards did stop there, loaded the bases double, walk and hit-by-pitch before Reggie Sanders collected two more RBIs on a two-run double to make it 5–0 later. That would bring Sanders' RBI total to ten for the series. Then Yadier Molina's two-run single off Clay Hensley in the top of the fifth made it 7–0 Cardinals. In the bottom of the inning, Joe Randa doubled before RBI singles by Eric Young and Mark Loretta made it 7–2 Cardinals. Then home runs by Dave Roberts's in the seventh off Brad Thompson and Ramón Hernández in the eighth off Julián Tavárez made it 7–4 Cardinals, but Jason Isringhausen came on to slam the door on the Padres in the ninth despite allowing a single and walk with Ryan Klesko's groundout ending the series.

Composite box
2005 NLDS (3–0): St. Louis Cardinals over San Diego Padres

Atlanta vs. Houston

Game 1

Andy Pettitte faced Tim Hudson in Game 1. Hudson struggled in his half of the first, giving up one run (on Morgan Ensberg's RBI single) on a walk and two hits, but got out of the inning with a crucial double play. Pettitte allowed a home run to Chipper Jones to tie the game, but otherwise cruised. The game remained 1–1 until the third when a bases-loaded (on a double and two walks) two-run single by Ensberg made it 3–1 Astros. A hit-by-pitch loaded the bases again, but Hudson got Adam Everett to ground out to end the inning. Next inning, Brad Ausmus hit a leadoff double, moved to third on a sacrifice bunt, and scored on Craig Biggio's sacrifice fly to make it 4–1 Astros. In the Braves' fourth, Andruw Jones hit a two-run home run to make it a one-run game. A walk and a bunt single put the tying run in scoring position later in the inning, but Brian Jordan grounded into a double play to end the rally. Pettitte would help his own cause in the seventh with the game still at 4–3, doubling and scoring on an RBI hit by Ensberg. It was now 5–3 and Hudson was finished. In the eighth, with Chris Reitsma pitching, the Astros opened the floodgates with a five-run rally, loading the bases on two singles and a walk before Jeff Bagwell's RBI single made it 6–3 Astros. John Foster in relief struck out Lance Berkman, but walked Ensberg to force in a run before a wild pitch scored another. After Jason Lane was intentionally walked to reload the bases, Orlando Palmeiro capped the inning's scoring with a two-run single that made it 10–3 Astros. The Braves scored two runs on Jones's RBI double in the eighth with two on off Dan Wheeler and the ninth on Johnny Estrada's RBI single after a leadoff triple off Russ Springer, but Mike Gallo got Rafael Furcal to hit into the game-ending double play as the Astros won Game 1 10–5.

Game 2

Roger Clemens faced John Smoltz in Game 2. Smoltz ran into trouble when he allowed two consecutive singles with one out. After a forceout, Jason Lane singled in Lance Berkman to make it 1–0 Astros. He intentionally loaded the bases, but got out of the inning with no more damage done. Then the Braves struck back against Clemens. With two outs and two men on, Brian McCann came up in his first ever postseason at-bat. He then slammed a three-run home run to right field, becoming the first Brave ever to homer in his first postseason at-bat. That sparked the Braves as they would go on to score two more in the third on a two-run double by Adam LaRoche. Smoltz pitched masterfully and the Braves added to their lead in the seventh on RBI singles by Andruw Jones and Jeff Francoeur off Chad Qualls. The Braves' victory in Game 2 was their last postseason win until 2010.

Game 3

Jorge Sosa faced Roy Oswalt in Game 3. Sosa fell behind early, allowing a double and hit-by-pitch before Morgan Ensberg's double and Jason Lane's sacrifice fly gave the Astros two runs in the first. The Braves tied the game in the next inning with back-to-back two out RBI singles by Brian McCann and Sosa. However, Mike Lamb hit the go-ahead home run in the bottom of the third. The two pitchers dueled until the bottom of the seventh when Chris Reitsma once again came into a close game. Reitsma allowed a double and single and the Braves' bullpen could do little to stop the Astros' rally. Lance Berkman hit an RBI single off John Foster, then Joey Devine allowed an RBI double to Ensberg and RBI single to Lane. Adam Everett's sacrifice fly off Jim Brower capped the inning's scoring. The Braves got a run in the eighth thanks to an RBI double by Andruw Jones off Dan Wheeler after Marcus Giles singled to lead off against Roy Oswalt, but no more. Brad Lidge pitched a scoreless ninth as the Astros won Game 3 7–3.

Game 4

The final game of the series lasted 18 innings and set records as the longest game in the history of Major League Baseball's postseason, both in terms of time and number of innings. This was two innings longer than another Astros playoff game, Game 6 of the 1986 NLCS, which went 16 innings, with the New York Mets prevailing 7–6. Coincidentally enough, Tim Hudson started both the 2005 and 2014 games, in the former as a Brave and the latter as a Giant. Additionally, Adam LaRoche was on the losing team in both games.

In the third, the Braves loaded the bases on two walks and a hit-by-pitch off Brandon Backe when Adam LaRoche's grand slam put them up 4–0. In the fifth, Andruw Jones's sacrifice fly with runners on second and third made it 5–0 and knocked Backe out of the game. In the bottom of the inning, the Astros loaded the bases on three singles but only scored once on Orlando Palmeiro's sacrifice fly. Brian McCann's home run in the eighth off Wandy Rodriguez made it 6–1 Braves, but in the bottom of the inning, a grand slam by Lance Berkman off Kyle Farnsworth (two runs charged to Hudson) and a home run by Brad Ausmus in the ninth off Farnsworth (with the Astros down to their last out) sent the game to extra innings. The second half of the game included three innings of relief by Roger Clemens, appearing as a pinch-hitter in the 15th inning and pitching in relief for only the second time in his career (and appearing this time only because the Astros were out of pitchers). Chris Burke hit the game-ending home run in the bottom of the 18th off Atlanta rookie Joey Devine, giving Houston the series victory and sending them to the NLCS to face the St. Louis Cardinals.

In addition to being at the time the longest postseason game in MLB history, it was also the only postseason game to include two grand slams, Lance Berkman's and Adam LaRoche's. Some commentators have pointed to this game as the greatest game in Houston Astros history, and one of the best games in the history of MLB playoffs.

Even more remarkable than the game's length, perhaps, is the fact that the fan who caught Chris Burke's walk-off homer in the 18th was the same fan who had caught Lance Berkman's grand slam in the eighth (Section 102, Row 2, Seat 15); the fan later donated both balls to the Baseball Hall of Fame.

Composite box
2005 NLDS (3–1): Houston Astros over Atlanta Braves

Notes

External links
STL vs. SDP at Baseball-Reference
HOU vs. ATL at Baseball-Reference

National League Division Series
National League Division Series
Houston Astros postseason
St. Louis Cardinals postseason
Atlanta Braves postseason
San Diego Padres postseason
National League Division Series
National League Division Series
National League Division Series
National League Division Series
2005 in Atlanta
2005 in Houston
2000s in San Diego
2000s in St. Louis
National League Division Series